Lovell Burchett Clarence (8 June 1838 - 1917) was a barrister and Puisne Justice of the Supreme Court of Ceylon from 1876 to 1888. Clarence went to the University of Cambridge and was called to the bar on 17 November 1864. Prior to serving as a Justice of the Supreme Court Clarence served as Deputy Queen's Advocate of Ceylon from 1873 to 1874 and Acting Queen's Advocate of Ceylon from 1874 to 1875 before being elevated to Second Puisne Justice on 1 February 1876 and finally Puisne Justice of the Supreme Court of Ceylon on 4 April 1876. Clarence was appointed to fill the vacancy caused by the retirement of Edward Shepherd Creasy. He was the 27th Supreme Court Justice.

Clarence married twice, first in 1867 to Blanche Gunter, secondly in 1901 to Elizabeth Whitton. Among his children were:
 George Clement Clarence, who m. 1902 Rose Caroline Alexandra McDowell, widow of Charles James Tolputt Merci, and daughter of George McDowell, FTCD.
 Oliver Burchett Clarence (1870–1955)

References

Citations

Bibliography

 
 
 

1838 births
1917 deaths
Alumni of Trinity College, Cambridge
Members of the Inner Temple
Puisne Justices of the Supreme Court of Ceylon
19th-century British people
20th-century British people
19th-century Sri Lankan people
British expatriates in Sri Lanka
Sri Lankan people of British descent